Louis Alexander Ciola (1922–1981) was an American Major League Baseball pitcher. He played for the Philadelphia Athletics during the  season.

References

Major League Baseball pitchers
Philadelphia Athletics players
Baseball players from Norfolk, Virginia
1922 births
1981 deaths
Richmond Spiders baseball players